Henry Yelverton may refer to:
 Henry Yelverton, 19th Baron Grey de Ruthyn (1780–1810), British peer
 Henry Yelverton (merchant) (1821–1880), Australian timber merchant
 Sir Henry Yelverton, 2nd Baronet (1633–1670), English politician
 Henry Yelverton (Australian politician) (1854–1906), Member of the Western Australian Legislative Council from 1901 to 1904
 Henry Yelverton (attorney-general) (1566–1629), English attorney-general
 Henry Yelverton, 3rd Earl of Sussex, Earl of Sussex
 Henry Yelverton, 1st Viscount Longueville, Viscount Longueville

See also 
 Yelverton (disambiguation)